Audrey Chu (born April 2, 1999), known by stage name Audrey Nuna, is an American R&B singer and rapper. She is best known for her singles "damn Right" and "Comic Sans" (featuring Jack Harlow). She was born and raised in New Jersey, and studied in the Clive Davis Music Institute of NYU for her freshman year, but has since taken a break to focus on music. Her songs are known to combine multiple genres such as pop, R&B, rap and trap. She is signed with Arista Records, under Sony Music Entertainment.

Early Life & Career 
Raised in suburban Manalapan, New Jersey, Audrey Nuna – known first professionally as Audrey – started making music in her teens covering artists from Childish Gambino to Drake and uploading the videos to combat the boredom of her hometown. Her first experience singing for a big crowd was performing ‘America the Beautiful’ at the US Open Tennis when she was ten.
Producer– and future manager – Anwar Sawyer contacted her after seeing her Instagram covers while she attended the Clive Davis Institute in Brooklyn. In 2018 she began releasing independent tracks. After producing three striking ballads, the confident sound of “Honeypot” showcased her musical versatility as a multi-genre artist. In 2019, after releasing two more singles, Sony Arista Records – coincidentally the record company that was founded by her university -- signed her to the label. She made her label debut with her single “Time”, then “Paper”, and her assertive collaboration with Jack Harlow in “Comic Sans”. She changed her stage name to Audrey Nuna after being inspired by her younger brother. In Korean, the suffix is a term boys use to address their older sisters, and younger males generally use it to refer to older females. Her name change incorporated her identity as a Korean American after years of trying to keep a low profile in her suburban hometown by reflecting the social hierarchy of respect built into Korean culture. The diversity of New York inspired her to embrace herself. After the name change, in 2020, she released more singles alongside “damn Right” and its DJ Snake-assisted sequel. She issued a ten-track project of previous singles and new tracks in 2021 aptly named A Liquid Breakfast.

Discography

Projects

Singles

References 

1999 births
Living people
21st-century American rappers
21st-century American singers
American people of Korean descent
Rappers from New Jersey
Singers from New Jersey